The Guadeloupe blind snake or Guadeloupe worm snake (Typhlops guadeloupensis) is a species of blind snake that is endemic to Guadeloupe, located in the Caribbean Lesser Antilles.  It is fairly widespread on the main islands of Basse-Terre and Grande-Terre, but is not recorded on the other Guadeloupean islands.

It is sometimes described as an endemic subspecies of Typhlops dominicanus, with a sister subspecies, T. d. dominicanus, present on Dominica.

References

External links
Typhlops guadeloupensis at the Reptile Database

Endemic fauna of Guadeloupe
Reptiles of Guadeloupe
Reptiles described in 1966
Typhlops